Sarkad is a district in north-eastern part of Békés County. Sarkad is also the name of the town where the district seat is found. The district is located in the Southern Great Plain Statistical Region.

Geography 
Sarkad District borders with Berettyóújfalu District (Hajdú-Bihar County) to the north, the Romanian county of Bihor to the east, Gyula District to the south, Békéscsaba District, Békés District and Szeghalom District to the west. The number of the inhabited places in Sarkad District is 11.

Municipalities 
The district has 1 town and 10 villages.
(ordered by population, as of 1 January 2012)

The bolded municipality is the city.

Demographics

In 2011, it had a population of 22,908 and the population density was 40/km².

Ethnicity
Besides the Hungarian majority, the main minorities are the Romanian and Roma (approx. 2,000).

Total population (2011 census): 22,908
Ethnic groups (2011 census): Identified themselves: 23,700 persons:
Hungarians: 19,758 (83.37%)
Romanians: 1,940 (8.19%)
Gypsies: 1,821 (7.68%)
Others and indefinable: 181 (0.76%)
Approx. 1,000 persons in Sarkad District did declare more than one ethnic group at the 2011 census.

Religion
Religious adherence in the county according to 2011 census:

Reformed – 7,429;
Catholic – 1,432 (Roman Catholic – 1,360; Greek Catholic – 72);
Orthodox – 1,200;
Evangelical – 76;
other religions – 846; 
Non-religious – 6,932; 
Atheism – 214;
Undeclared – 4,779.

Gallery

See also
List of cities and towns of Hungary

References

External links
 Postal codes of the Sarkad District

Districts in Békés County